Jatrorrhizine is a protoberberine alkaloid found in some plant species, such as Enantia chlorantha (Annonaceae). Synonyms that may be encountered include jateorrhizine, neprotin, jatrochizine, jatrorhizine, and yatrorizine.

Bioactive effects 
Jatrorrhizine has been reported to have antiinflammatory effect, and to improve blood flow and mitotic activity in thioacetamide-traumatized rat livers.  It was found to have antimicrobial and antifungal activity.  It binds and noncompetitively inhibits monoamine oxidase (IC50 = 4 μM for MAO-A and 62 μM for MAO-B)  It interferes with multidrug resistance by cancer cells in vitro when exposed to a chemotherapeutic agent.  Large doses (50–100 mg/kg) reduced blood sugar levels in mice by increasing aerobic glycolysis.

Derivatives of jatrorrhizine (notably 3-alkoxy derivatives, and specifically 3-octyloxy 8-alkyljatrorrhizine derivatives such as 3-octyloxy 8-butyljatrorrhizine) have been synthesized and found to have much stronger antimicrobial effects.

References 

Isoquinolinoisoquinolines
Quaternary ammonium compounds
Phenol ethers
Phenols
Isoquinoline alkaloids